The Hunter 340 is an American sailboat that was designed by the Hunter Design Team as cruising sailboat and first built in 1997.

Production
The design was built by Hunter Marine in the United States starting in 1997, but it is now out of production.

Design
The Hunter 340 is a recreational keelboat, built predominantly of fiberglass. It has a fractional sloop B&R rig, a slightly raked stem, a walk-through reverse transom with an integral swim platform and ladder, an internally mounted spade-type rudder controlled by a wheel and a fixed fin keel. It displaces  and carries  of ballast.

There is also a  holding tank.

Standard factory equipment on the 340 included a 110% genoa, dual two-speed self-tailing winches, a stainless steel mainsheet arch, dorade vents, a marine VHF radio, knotmeter, depth sounder, stereo system, a hardwood cabin sole, private forward and aft cabins, a dinette table that converts to a double bunk, a fully enclosed head with a shower, a microwave oven, double stainless steel sink, two burner liquefied petroleum gas stove, icebox, kitchen dishes, anchor, four life jackets and an emergency tiller. Optional equipment included a bimini, mast furling mainsail, autopilot, mainsheet traveller, refrigerator, air conditioning and a spinnaker and related hardware.

The design has a PHRF racing average handicap of 141 with a high of 150 and low of 135.

See also
List of sailing boat types

Related development
Hunter 336

Similar sailboats
Abbott 33
C&C 3/4 Ton
C&C 33
C&C 101
C&C SR 33
CS 33
Endeavour 33
Hunter 33
Hunter 33-2004
Hunter 33.5
Hunter 333
Marlow-Hunter 33
Mirage 33
Moorings 335
Nonsuch 33
Tanzer 10
Viking 33

References

External links
Official brochure

Keelboats
1990s sailboat type designs
Sailing yachts
Sailboat type designs by Hunter Design Team
Sailboat types built by Hunter Marine